= Jumpstart Academy Africa =

Jumpstart Academy Africa is a for impact social venture which utilizes entrepreneurial leadership and mentoring to solve Africa’ human capital problem which starts at the secondary school level. The founding mission of the Academy is to create a wave of entrepreneurial leaders by pioneering a world class Leadership and Entrepreneurship curriculum.

== History ==
The Academy was launched in Cameroon in 2014 and is currently led by Dr. Estella Bih-Neh Jifon who is the Executive Director. The Academy has trained over 20000 young people to date across Cameroon and Togo.

JumpStart Academy Africa has been featured by Forbes due to their ground breaking work in the space of Education and Youth entrepreneurship.

Jumpstart Academy Africa seeks to deal with the human capital dilemma that Africa experiences today. The organization's strategy is to help nurture youth leaders and entrepreneurs who espouse ethics by means of a global curriculum in leadership and entrepreneurship across various learning institutions. The Academy's three essential components include a two-year leadership and entrepreneurship training for student so their skills will be improved. The focus will be on employment prospects, enterprise building, civic accountability, and community engagement. It also offers coaching to guide students in the transition from secondary to college environment as well as tutorials for promoting students’ learning outcomes.

This interactive strategy of learning as well as the Academy's program promotes critical thinking, principled leadership, and an entrepreneurial method of problem-solving along with civic engagement. The approach can help many youth between 14 and 18 years of age to turn out as contributors in the job market.
